Beer is an English and German surname. Notable people with this surname include the following:

Alan Beer (born 1950), Welsh footballer
Alexander Beer (1873–1944), German architect
Alice Beer (born 1965), English television presenter
Angelika Beer (born 1957), German politician (Alliance 90/The Greens)
Anthony Stafford Beer (1926–2002), English theorist in operational research, founder of management cybernetics
Arthur Beer (1900–1980), German astronomer
August Beer (1825–1863), German mathematician, chemist and physicist
Axel Beer (born 1956), German musicologist
Carol Beer, a fictional character from British comedy show Little Britain, portrayed by David Walliams
Charles Beer (born 1941), Canadian politician
Claudia Beer (born 1993), German curler
Cheryl Beer, Welsh singer and multi-media artist
Edwin Beer (1876–1938), American surgeon
Edwin John Beer (1879-1986), British chemist and geologist
Ferdinand P. Beer (1915–2003), French mechanical engineer and university professor
Sir Gavin Rylands de Beer (1899–1972), English evolutionary embryologist
Georg Joseph Beer (1763–1821), Austrian physician, founder of the research center of ophthalmology
George Louis Beer (1872–1920), American historian
Giacomo Meyerbeer (born Yaakov Liebmann Beer) (1791–1864), German composer, brother of Wilhelm Beer and writer Michael Beer
Gillian Beer (born 1935), English literary critic
Isaiah Beer Bing (1759–1805), French writer and translator
Israel Beer (1912–1966), Israeli senior official convicted of espionage
Jannie de Beer (born 1971), South Africa rugby player
Jens Henrik Beer (1799–1881), Norwegian businessperson, farmer and politician
Jolyn Beer (born 1994), German sport shooter
Joseph Beer (1908–1987), operetta composer
Joseph Beer (clarinetist) (1744–1811)
Klaus Beer (born 1942), German track & field athlete
Madison Beer (born 1999), American singer and actress
Maggie Beer (born 1945), Australian chef
Maike Beer (born 1996), German curler
Max Josef Beer (1851–1908), Austrian composer
Michael Beer (cricketer) (born 1984), Australian cricketer
Michael Beer (poet) (1800–1833), German poet
Moses Shabbethai Beer (d. 1835), Italian rabbi
Nicola Beer (born 1970), German politician
Oliver Beer (footballer) (born 1979), German footballer
Peter Beer (judge) (1928–2018), American judge and politician
Peter Beer (RAF officer) (born 1941), British Air Vice Marshal
Phil Beer (born 1953), English multi-instrumentalist, composer and producer
Randall Beer, American computer scientist
Richard Beer-Hofmann (1866–1945), Austrian writer
Seth Beer (born 1996), American baseball player
Vivian Beer (born 1977), American designer and artist
Wilhelm Beer (1797–1850), German banker and astronomer
Will Beer (born 1988), English cricketer

See also
Beers (surname)

English-language surnames
German-language surnames
Jewish surnames
Surnames from nicknames